The Magic of Atlantis is an anthology of fantasy short stories, edited by Lin Carter. It was first published in paperback by Lancer Books in November 1970.

Summary
The book collects seven fantasy tales by various authors set on the fictional lost continent of Atlantis, with an introduction by Carter.

Contents
"Beyond the Pillars of Hercules" (introduction) (Lin Carter)
"The Mirrors of Tuzun Thune" (Robert E. Howard)
"The Spawn of Dagon" (Henry Kuttner)
"The Eye of Tandyla" (L. Sprague de Camp)
"The Seal of Zaon Sathla" (Lin Carter)
"The Vengeance of Ulios" (Edmond Hamilton)
"The Death of Malygris" (Clark Ashton Smith)
"Heart of Atlantan" (Nictzin Dyalhis)

Notes

1970 anthologies
Fantasy anthologies
Lin Carter anthologies
Atlantis in fiction
Lancer Books books